Deh-e Segi (also Romanized as Deh-e Segī; also known as Deysegī) is a village in Deh Kahan Rural District, Aseminun District, Manujan County, Kerman Province, Iran. At the 2006 census, its population was 184, in 42 families.

References 

Populated places in Manujan County